Charles Wilkes (April 3, 1798 – February 8, 1877) was an American naval officer, ship's captain, and explorer. He led the United States Exploring Expedition (1838–1842).

During the American Civil War (1861–1865), he commanded  during the Trent Affair in which he stopped a Royal Mail ship and removed two Confederate diplomats, which almost led to war between the United States and the United Kingdom.

Early life and career
Wilkes was born in New York City, on April 3, 1798, as the great nephew of the former Lord Mayor of London John Wilkes. His mother was Mary Seton, who died in 1802 when Charles was just three years old. As a result, Charles was raised and home tutored by his aunt, Elizabeth Ann Seton, fluent in French from her own upbringing in New Rochelle, New York, a French Huguenots settlement. Charles became himself fluent, which served him well throughout his career as demonstrated dealing with officials during an extended stay in Europe (1830-1831) to the point of participating to much cultural and social life in France. His fluency was also demonstrated during his exploration of Puget Sound in 1841 with French speaking guide Simon Plamondon. Seton would later convert to Roman Catholicism and become the first American-born woman canonized a saint by the Catholic Church. When Elizabeth was left widowed with five children, Charles was sent to a boarding school, and later attended Columbia College, which is the present-day Columbia University. He entered the United States Navy as a midshipman in 1818, and became a lieutenant in 1826.

In 1833, for his survey of Narragansett Bay, he was placed in charge of the Navy's Department of Charts and Instruments, out of which developed the Naval Observatory and Hydrographic Office. Wilkes' interdisciplinary expedition (1838–1842) set a physical oceanography benchmark for the office's first superintendent Matthew Fontaine Maury.

He was elected to the American Philosophical Society in 1843.

Columbian Institute

During the 1820s, Wilkes was a member of the prestigious Columbian Institute for the Promotion of Arts and Sciences, which counted among its members presidents Andrew Jackson and John Quincy Adams and many prominent men of the day, including well-known representatives of the military, government service, medical, and other professions.

South Seas expedition

In 1838, although not yet a seasoned naval line officer, Wilkes was experienced in nautical survey work, and was working with civilian scientists. Upon this background, he was given command of the government exploring expedition "... for the purpose of exploring and surveying the Southern Ocean,... as well to determine the existence of all doubtful islands and shoals, as to discover, and accurately fix, the position of those which [lay] in or near the track of our vessels in that quarter, and [might] have escaped the observation of scientific navigators." The US Exploring Squadron was authorized by act of the Congress on May 18, 1836.

Departing from Hampton Roads on August 18, 1838, the expedition stopped at the Madeira Islands and Rio de Janeiro; visited Tierra del Fuego, Chile, Peru, the Tuamotu Archipelago, Samoa, and New South Wales; from Sydney sailed into the Antarctic Ocean in December 1839 and reported the discovery "of an Antarctic continent west of the Balleny Islands" of which it sighted the coast on January 25, 1840. After charting 1500 miles of Antarctic coastline, the expedition visited Fiji and the Hawaiian Islands. In Fiji, the expedition kidnapped the chief Ro Veidovi, charging him with the murder of a crew of American whalers. And, in July 1840, two sailors, one of whom was Wilkes' nephew, Midshipman Wilkes Henry, were killed while bartering for food on Fiji's Malolo Island. Wilkes' retribution was swift and severe. According to an old man from Malolo Island, nearly 80 Fijians were killed in the incident.

From December 1840 to March 1841, he employed hundreds of native Hawaiian porters and many of his men to haul a pendulum to the summit of Mauna Loa to measure gravity. Instead of using the existing trail, he blazed his own way, taking much longer than he anticipated. The conditions on the mountain reminded him of Antarctica. Many of his crew suffered snow blindness, altitude sickness and foot injuries from wearing out their shoes.

He explored the west coast of North America, including the Strait of Juan de Fuca, Puget Sound, the Columbia River, San Francisco Bay and the Sacramento River, in 1841. He held the first American Independence Day celebration west of the Mississippi River in Dupont, Washington, on July 5, 1841. The United States Exploring Expedition passed through the Ellice Islands and visited Funafuti, Nukufetau and Vaitupu in 1841. The expedition returned by way of the Philippines, the Sulu Archipelago, Borneo, Singapore, Polynesia and the Cape of Good Hope, reaching New York on June 10, 1842.

After having completely encircled the globe (his was the last all-sail naval mission to do so), Wilkes had logged some 87,000 miles and lost two ships and 28 men. Wilkes was court-martialed upon his return for the loss of one of his ships on the Columbia River bar, for the regular mistreatment of his subordinate officers, and for excessive punishment of his sailors. A major witness against him was ship doctor Charles Guillou. He was acquitted on all charges except illegally punishing men in his squadron. For a short time, he was attached to the Coast Survey, but from 1844 to 1861, he was chiefly engaged in preparing the report of the expedition.

His Narrative of the United States Exploring Expedition (5 volumes and an atlas) was published in 1844. He edited the scientific reports of the expedition (19 volumes and 11 atlases, 1844–1874) and was the author of Vol. XI (Meteorology) and Vol. XXIII (Hydrography). Alfred Thomas Agate, engraver and illustrator, was the designated portrait and botanical artist of the expedition. His work was used to illustrate the Narrative of the United States Exploring Expedition. The Narrative contains much interesting material concerning the manners, customs, political and economic conditions in many places then little known. Wilkes' 1841 Map of the Oregon Territory pre-dated John Charles Fremont's first Oregon Trail pathfinder expedition guided by Kit Carson during 1842.

Other valuable contributions were the three reports of James Dwight Dana on Zoophytes (1846), Geology (1849) and Crustacea (1852–1854). Moreover, the specimens and artifacts brought back by expedition scientists ultimately formed the foundation for the Smithsonian Institution collection. In addition to many shorter articles and reports, Wilkes published the major scientific works Western America, including California and Oregon in 1849 and Voyage round the world: embracing the principal events of the narrative of the United States Exploring Expedition in one volume: illustrated with one hundred and seventy-eight engravings on wood in 1849, and Theory of the Winds in 1856.

Civil War

Wilkes was promoted to the rank of commander in 1843 and that of captain in 1855.

Trent Affair

As part of these duties, he visited the British colony of Bermuda in 1861. Acting on orders, Wilkes remained in port for nearly a week aboard his flagship, violating the British rule that allowed American naval vessels (of either side) to remain in port for only a single day. While Wilkes remained in port, his gunboats  and  blockaded Saint George's harbor, a key Confederate blockade runner base. The gunboats opened fire at the RMS Merlin.

When Wilkes learned that James Murray Mason and John Slidell, two Confederate commissioners (to Britain and France, respectively), were bound for England on a British packet boat, he ordered the steam frigate San Jacinto to stop them. On November 8, 1861, San Jacinto met Trent and fired two shots across its bow, forcing the ship to stop. A party from San Jacinto led by its captain then boarded Trent and arrested Mason and Slidell, a further violation of British neutrality. The diplomats were taken to Fort Warren in Boston Harbor.

The actions of "The Notorious Wilkes," as Bermuda media branded him, were contrary to maritime law and convinced many that full-scale war between the United States and England was inevitable.

He was officially thanked by Congress "for his brave, adroit and patriotic conduct". However, his action was later disavowed by President Lincoln due to diplomatic protests by the British government (Mason and Slidell were released). His next service was in the James River flotilla and he was placed on the retired list on December 21, 1861. Subsequently, after reaching the rank of commodore on July 16, 1862, he was assigned to duty against blockade runners in the West Indies.

West Indies Squadron
As commander of the West Indies Squadron, Wilkes repeatedly complained of having an insufficient force, and he twice seconded to his own fleet ships ordered to other duties, even in spite of direct orders to release them. Though he had a degree of success in the capture of blockade runners, in which he profited personally, he drew criticism for failing in his primary task, the capture of the commerce raiders CSS Alabama and CSS Florida. He also repeatedly exacerbated diplomatic relations with the British, Spanish, Dutch, French, Danes and Mexicans through his arrogant and illegal activities in the West Indies and Bermuda. In violation of international law regarding belligerent nations, he established coal depots on a number of neutral islands and frequently illegally hovered outside of neutral ports. The British accused him of establishing virtual blockades of the ports of Nassau and St. George's, where his arrogant behavior even led to suspicions that he had been sent to intentionally insult the British, while the French similarly accused him of effectively blockading Martinique. Wilkes justified his actions by calling the ports little short of operational bases for blockade runners. His capture of ships such as the Peterhoff, Dolphin, Springbok, and Victor resulted in diplomatic remonstrations explicitly directed against Wilkes. He was recalled from his West Indies command in June 1863, a consequence of multiple factors. His failure to capture the Confederate commerce raiders certainly played a role, and his retention of the USS Vanderbilt in direct contravention of explicit orders to release it to independently hunt the Alabama served as a justification, but he probably owed his removal primarily to the seeming never-ending stream of complaints from neutral nations over his actions.

Court martial
Though supported by him in many of his actions in the West Indies, Wilkes frequently found himself in open conflict with Secretary of the Navy Gideon Welles. Welles had recommended that Wilkes had been too old to receive the rank of commodore under the act then governing promotions.

When Welles severely criticized Wilkes in his December 1863 annual report over his retention of the Vanderbilt, Wilkes wrote a scathing response that found its way into the newspapers. A court of inquiry accused Wilkes of responsibility for its publication, and he was brought before a March 1864 court martial, facing charges of disobedience of orders, insubordination, disrespect of a superior officer, disobedience of naval regulations, and conduct unbecoming an officer. He was found guilty of all charges and sentenced to public reprimand and suspension for three years. However, Lincoln reduced the suspension to one year, and the balance of charges were dropped. On July 25, 1866, he was promoted to the rank of rear admiral on the retired list.

Later life

One historian speculated that Wilkes' obsessive behavior and harsh code of shipboard discipline shaped Herman Melville's characterization of Captain Ahab in Moby-Dick. Such speculation is not mentioned in the United States Navy historical archives.

In addition to his contribution to United States naval history and scientific study in his official Narrative of the Exploration Squadron (6 volumes), Wilkes wrote his autobiography.

Wilkes died in Washington, D.C. with the rank of Rear Admiral. In August 1909, the United States moved his remains to Arlington National Cemetery. His gravestone says that "he discovered the Ant-arctic continent."

Legacy

 The United States Navy named three ships for Wilkes: torpedo boat  that served around the turn of the 20th-century, destroyer  that served during World War I, and destroyer  that served during World War II. 
 An oceanographic survey vessel, the USS Wilkes (T-AGS-33), was launched in 1969 with the sponsorship of Mrs. Hollis Lyons Joy (Deborah Wilkes Joy), Wilkes' great-granddaughter.
 Wilkes Land in Antarctica is named after him.
 In 1923, Wilkes Island, one of the three islands surrounding the lagoon at Wake Atoll, was named for Wilkes by Alexander Wetmore who was the lead scientist of the Tanager Expedition.
 Captain Charles Wilkes Elementary in Bainbridge Island, Washington was named in his honor.
 Wilkes Boulevard in Columbia, Missouri is named in his honor.
 The Hawaiian plant genus Wilkesia was named in his honor.

Dates of rank
 Midshipman – 1 January 1818
 Lieutenant – 28 April 1826
 Commander – 13 July 1843
 Captain – 14 September 1855
 Retired List, 21 December 1861
 Commodore, Retired List – 16 July 1862
 Rear Admiral, Retired List – 6 August 1866

Publications
 
 Western America, Including California and Oregon, with Maps of Those Regions ... (1849)
 Defence of Com. Charles Wilkes (1864)

See also

 European and American voyages of scientific exploration

Sources

References

Attribution:

Further reading
Blumenthal, Richard W. Charles Wilkes and the Exploration of Inland Washington Waters: Journals from the Expedition of 1841. Jefferson, NC: McFarland & Co, 2009. 
Philbrick, Nathaniel. Sea of Glory: America's Voyage of Discovery: the U.S. Exploring Expedition, 1838–1842. New York: Penguin Books, 2004. 
Wolfe, Cheri. Lt. Charles Wilkes and the Great U.S. Exploring Expedition. New York: Chelsea House Publishers, 1991.

External links

 Smithsonian Digital Library Narrative of the United States Exploring Expedition, Charles Wilkes USN
 Guide to the Charles Wilkes Papers, 1816–1876, Rubenstein Rare Book and Manuscript Library, Duke University
 
 
 
 Wilkes Family Papers, J Murrey Atkins Library, UNC Charlotte
 

1798 births
1877 deaths
19th-century explorers
American explorers
American geographers
American oceanographers
American explorers of the Pacific
Burials at Arlington National Cemetery
Circumnavigators of the globe
Columbia College (New York) alumni
Explorers of Antarctica
Explorers of Oregon
People of the United States Exploring Expedition
Union Navy officers
United States Navy rear admirals (upper half)
Military personnel from New York City